Vladimír Andrs (12 May 1937 – 17 June 2018) was a Czech rower.

Andrs was born in Prague in 1937. He competed at the 1961 European Rowing Championships in single sculls and won silver. In 1964 he and his partner Pavel Hofmann competed for Czechoslovakia in the double sculls event at the 1964 Summer Olympics and won a bronze medal.

References

1937 births
2018 deaths
Czech male rowers
Czechoslovak male rowers
Olympic rowers of Czechoslovakia
Rowers at the 1964 Summer Olympics
Olympic bronze medalists for Czechoslovakia
Olympic medalists in rowing
Medalists at the 1964 Summer Olympics
Rowers from Prague
European Rowing Championships medalists